The Grand Council of Fribourg is the legislature of the canton of Fribourg, in Switzerland.  Fribourg has a unicameral legislature.  The Grand Council has 110 seats, with members elected every four years.

References and notes

External links
  Grand Council of Fribourg official website
  Parlinfo

Fribourg
Canton of Fribourg
Fribourg